This is a list of Flying Dutchman sailboat championships.

Olympic Games

Asian Games 
Source:

Pan American Games

World Championship 

Source:

European Championship
Source:

Vintage Yachting Games 
Source:

See also
 Flying Dutchman World Championship
 Sailing at the 1960 Summer Olympics – Flying Dutchman
 Sailing at the 1964 Summer Olympics – Flying Dutchman
 Sailing at the 1968 Summer Olympics – Flying Dutchman
 Sailing at the 1972 Summer Olympics – Flying Dutchman
 Sailing at the 1976 Summer Olympics – Flying Dutchman
 Sailing at the 1980 Summer Olympics – Flying Dutchman
 Sailing at the 1984 Summer Olympics – Flying Dutchman
 Sailing at the 1988 Summer Olympics – Flying Dutchman
 Sailing at the 1992 Summer Olympics – Flying Dutchman

References

Flying Dutchman (dinghy)
World championships in sailing